was an officer and ace fighter pilot in the Imperial Japanese Navy (IJN) during the Second Sino-Japanese War and the Pacific theater of World War II. In aerial combat over China and the Pacific, he was officially credited with destroying 27 enemy aircraft.

Flying ace
Akamatsu was known as a troublemaker and trickster. Many of his air victories were obtained while drunk. Despite this, his supervisors stood behind him, as did his fellow pilots who frequently defended and covered for him. Henry Sakaida confirmed that Akamatsu flew for more than 8,000 flight hours. At the end of the war, Akamatsu flew the Mitsubishi J2M Raiden fighter.

Akamatsu was credited with shooting down 11 enemy aircraft over China in the Second Sino-Japanese War, including four in a single engagement near Nanchang on 25 February 1938. In the opening months of the Pacific War, he served in the Philippines and Dutch East Indies campaigns. From January 1944 until the end of the war, Akamatsu flew out of Atsugi Air Base, defending Tokyo from Allied air attacks.

After the war

After the war, Akamatsu worked as a fish search pilot for the Kōchi Fishery Association and later ran a small cafe in Kōchi. After struggling for years with alcoholism, Akamatsu died of pneumonia on 22 February 1980.

References

Notes

Sources

External links
 "Song of Raiden fighter squadron", Nippon News, No. 254. in the official website of NHK. 

The Bad Boys

1910 births
1980 deaths
Japanese naval aviators
Japanese World War II flying aces
People from Kōchi Prefecture
Deaths from pneumonia in Japan
Imperial Japanese Navy officers